Edwin Hermans (born 23 May 1974) is a Dutch former footballer, who played as a left-back. After his playing career, he moved to coaching.

Early life 

Hermans was born in Goirle. He started playing football with amateur club RKTVV from Tilburg. At the age of 17, he was scouted by PSV, where he played for the youth team. His first coach at PSV was Huub Stevens, whom he credits with creating an "undefeatable mentality" in him.

Club career

PSV and loans 
Hermans never played a match for PSV's first team. Instead, he made his debut in professional football for Eerste Divisie club Eindhoven in the 1993–94 season, on loan from PSV. The following season, he was loaned to Eredivisie side FC Volendam.

MVV 
In 1995, he moved to Eerste Divisie club MVV, where he became a regular at left back. In his second season, Hermans helped MVV win the title and promotion to the Eredivisie.

Fortuna Sittard 
In the summer of 1997, Hermans moved to Fortuna Sittard, where he would be a regular for five seasons. In his first season, Fortuna, who were managed by Bert van Marwijk, reached seventh place and qualified for the Intertoto Cup. In the 1998–99 season, Fortuna finished tenth and were runners-up in the KNVB Cup. After Van Marwijk left the club in the summer of 2000, however, they began to drop into the relegation zone, and at the end of the 2001–02 season, Fortuna were relegated.

De Graafschap 
Following Fortuna Sittard's relegation, Hermans remained in the Eredivisie, having been signed by De Graafschap. The 2002–03 season was not a success, however, as De Graafschap were relegated. In the 2003–04 Eerste Divisie season, despite finishing in sixth place in the regular competition, Hermans helped De Graafschap win one of the two playoffs groups and achieve promotion back to the Eredivisie.

Return to Fortuna Sittard 
In 2004, Hermans made a return to Fortuna Sittard. He played for the club for two more seasons, both of which ended with Fortuna in last place of the Eerste Divisie.

Willem II 
On 31 August 2006, Hermans was signed by Willem II, who were looking to add experienced players to their young squad. Hermans' transfer was met with some surprise, because at the time, he was a substitute player at Fortuna Sittard, a rather modest Eerste Divisie club; Willem II, on the other hand, were a steady Eredivisie club. He would make ten appearances for the team, nine of those coming before the winter break. Due to a back injury, his playing time in the second part of the season was limited to one substitute appearance. He retired at the end of the season.

Managerial career 
Immediately after retiring, Hermans started his managerial career at Willem II, coaching various youth teams. On 19 February 2010, following the dismissal of manager Alfons Groenendijk, Hermans was appointed assistant manager of the first team, alongside interim manager Mark Schenning and then new manager Arno Pijpers. In July 2010, Hermans moved to MVV to work as assistant manager. In May 2014, it was announced that his contract would not be extended due to budget cuts. In 2015, after the summer break, Hermans was appointed manager of amateur club VV SCM. In November 2015, Hermans declined an offer to become manager of Fortuna Sittard.

Personal life 

Hermans is married to Caroline. They have three children named Kay, Pleun and Daantje.

Honours 

MVV
 Eerste Divisie: 1996–97

References

1974 births
Living people
Dutch footballers
FC Eindhoven players
FC Volendam players
MVV Maastricht players
Fortuna Sittard players
De Graafschap players
Willem II (football club) players
People from Goirle
Association football fullbacks
Willem II (football club) non-playing staff
Footballers from North Brabant